Kazanovka is a rural locality (a selo) in Novospassky Selsoviet of Arkharinsky District, Amur Oblast, Russia. The population was 36 in 2018. There are 3 streets.

Geography 
Kazanovka is located near the left bank of the Bureya River, 75 km northwest of Arkhara (the district's administrative centre) by road. Novospassk is the nearest rural locality.

References 

Rural localities in Arkharinsky District